Thirukkalyanam is a 1978 Indian Tamil-language film directed by K. Chandra Bose. The film stars Vijayakumar, Srividya and SR Vijaya.

Cast 
Vijayakumar
Srividya
S.R.Vijaya

Soundtrack
The music composed by Ilaiyaraaja.

References

External links
 

1978 films
Films scored by Ilaiyaraaja
1970s Tamil-language films